Agapanthia angelicae is a species of longhorn beetle in the subfamily Lamiinae, found in Central Asia and Iran. Adults are on wing from May to June. They feed on Ferula hermonis.

References

angelicae
Beetles described in 1898
Beetles of Asia